Lathosterol oxidase is a Δ7-sterol 5(6)-desaturase enzyme that in humans is encoded by the SC5D gene.

This gene encodes an enzyme of cholesterol biosynthesis. The encoded protein catalyzes the conversion of lathosterol into 7-dehydrocholesterol. Mutations in this gene have been associated with lathosterolosis. Alternatively spliced transcript variants encoding the same protein have been described.

References

Further reading